Baryshev (masculine) or Barysheva (feminine) is a Russian surname. Notable people with the surname include:

Olga Barysheva (born 1954), Russian basketball player
Tatyana Barysheva (1896–1979), Russian Soviet actress
Varvara Barysheva (born 1977), Russian speed skater
Victor Barîșev (born 1978), Moldovan footballer
Vladimir Baryshev (born 1960), Russian footballer and manager

Russian-language surnames